SPH MediaWorks Ltd was a free-to-air terrestrial television broadcaster in Singapore that operated two television channels: Channel U and Channel i. It merged with the city-state's long-established broadcasting company, Mediacorp, in 2004.

History
On 31 March 2000, Mr Lee Cheok Yew was appointed as the CEO of SPH MediaWorks Ltd. Mr Man Shu Sum and some of the Mediacorp artistes joined from SPH MediaWorks the former as Chief Operating Officer of Mediacorp.

The company was founded by Singapore Press Holdings on 8 June 2000, and appointed local television industry veteran Lee Cheok Yew as its CEO. By October of the same year, the company announced that five actors and actresses: Kym Ng, Bryan Wong, Darren Lim, Wang Yuqing and Guo Liang have joined their ranks.

In November that same year, six actors and actresses from the company's Chinese Media and Entertainment division attended training sessions in China and Taiwan, and two journalists have joined their television news division. By December, the company announced that five English-speaking actors and actresses, including local comedy star Adrian Pang, have joined their ranks.

On 26 April 2001, the Singapore Broadcasting Authority (now Infocomm Media Development Authority) announce it has issued a Nationwide Free-To-Air Television Service Licence to SPH MediaWorks. According to the terms of the license, the company will operate two channels: Channel U and TVWorks, from May that same year.

In November 2001, viewing figures cited by Singapore Press Holdings show Channel U as the second most watched television station in Singapore, That same year, 73 employees were laid off from MediaWorks, due to a restructuring exercise at TVWorks, as well as a weak advertising market.

On 3 October 2001, SPH Radio Broadcasting Arm, a joint management between SPH Multimedia and NTUC Media was launched as SPH UnionWorks; owns, manages, and operates UFM 1003 and WKRZ 91.3FM. Both radio stations were simply re-branded and resume operations of Heart 100.3FM and 91.3FM previously wholly owned by NTUC Media.

On 3 March 2002, SPH MediaWorks TVWorks was renamed SPH MediaWorks Channel i.

On 4 December 2002, MediaWorks won the "Broadcaster of the Year" award in "Asia Television Awards". Channel U also bagged the "Channel of the Year" award.

Channel U organised a charity show, "Ren Ci Charity Show", shortly after being named the Broadcaster of the Year. Ren Ci Charity Show bore similarity to those hosted by Mediacorp. The audience was be fed with intense performance presented by actors, actresses and guests and encouraged to donate, commonly through telephone or mobile phone. However, this program did not make use of material incentive to encourage donations unlike any other charity shows going on then. With the great team effort of the Mediaworks team in both years of the show under SPH MediaWorks donations broke previously set records.

Mr Lee Cheok Yew resigned as CEO of SPH MediaWorks on 1 April 2003.

Channel i News won the "Best News Programme" of "Asia Television Awards" on 19 December 2003.

Merger
On 17 September 2004, however, Singapore Press Holdings (SPH) and Mediacorp Singapore Pte Ltd (Mediacorp) announced that both of their companies will be formally merging their television networks and operations, of which operates the mainstream free-to-air terrestrial channels; Mediacorp Channel 5, Mediacorp Channel 8, TVMobile, SPH MediaWorks Channel U (优频道) and SPH MediaWorks Channel i. The other free-to-air terrestrial channels, Mediacorp Suria and Mediacorp Central run by Mediacorp TV12 and Channel NewsAsia by Mediacorp News remained wholly owned and run by Mediacorp Pte Ltd, in contrast to the channels owned by Mediacorp TV Pte Ltd under the holding company of Mediacorp Television Broadcasting Arm (a Mediacorp channel) as of 1 January 2005; Mediacorp Television Broadcasting Arm were 80% managed by Mediacorp and 20% by Singapore Press Holdings (SPH) through SPH Multimedia Ltd.  The merger was seen as a move to reduce the losses faced by SPH since the launch of SPH MediaWorks Channel U and SPH MediaWorks Channel i, and to reduce the losses in the free newspaper market of "Today" faced by Mediacorp.

Apart from the merging of local television operations, the merger includes the joining of free newspaper operations of both Mediacorp and Singapore Press Holdings (SPH). Streats, managed by Singapore Press Holdings (SPH) was merged into “Today”; Streats would cease its independent publication upon the completion of the merger. “Today” continues to be managed by Mediacorp solely. The merger of the two companies was also the first of its kind in history; a merger between a government unit and a private organization. It is inevitable, as Singapore free to air television market is small. The fact that SPH MediaWorks keeps operating their broadcast business at a loss makes merger with Mediacorp a viable solution as a more established company that owns a larger television network.

The two companies were formally merged completely on 31 December 2004, and it was also announced that SPH MediaWorks' two channels, Channel i and Channel U, after being seen as not commercially viable to maintain, mainly due to small local television markets, were permanently shutting down along with the whole network. They ceased transmission during the wee hours in the morning on 1 January 2005.

Subsequent divestment from Mediacorp
On 25 August 2017, SPH announced that it would divest its shares from Mediacorp, which are 20 percent in Mediacorp TV and 40 percent in Mediacorp Press in a move to focus on its core media businesses. Mediacorp would thus acquire these stakes for S$18 million, resulting in both companies being full subsidiaries of Mediacorp when completed. This comes after Mediacorp announced that it would stop publishing Today as a hardcopy and go fully digital from end-September 2017, coming as more readers are inclined towards consuming news digitally. The digitalisation of Today would result in 40 roles being made redundant. In addition, Mediacorp agreed not to publish any soft copy or digital format of Today similar to a hardcopy newspaper for five years. The acquisition of SPH's stakes is completed on 29 September 2017, thus returning to 2000 when media competition had not started yet.

Channels
 Channel U
This was the second Mandarin television channel in Singapore (after channel 8), which became integrated with Mediacorp's management on 1 January 2005.

 Channel i
This was the second English television channel in Singapore. It ceased operations on 1 January 2005 when SPH Mediaworks and Mediacorp merged.

See also
Broadcasting in Singapore
Mediacorp
Singapore Press Holdings

References

 
Defunct companies of Singapore
Broadcasting in Singapore
Television channels and stations established in 2000
Television channels and stations disestablished in 2005
Television stations in Singapore
2000 establishments in Singapore
2005 disestablishments in Singapore